MSC Zoe 
was one of the largest container ships in the world when built in 2015. It is the third of a series of ships built by MSC, after MSC Oscar and MSC Oliver.

Name
MSC Zoe takes her name from the four year old grand-daughter of Gianluigi Aponte, the Mediterranean Shipping Company (MSC) president and chief executive.

Construction
MSC Zoe was built by Daewoo in South Korea for $140m.

Ship's particulars
At the length of 395 metres (1295'), Zoe has a draft of 16 meters (52'). She has a capacity of 19,224 TEU and a cargo capacity (dwt) of 199,272 tonnes.

Propulsion

Loss of containers at sea

On 1 January 2019 342 containers went overboard on the North Sea. 297 containers lost north of the Dutch island Ameland, the remaining containers some hours later north of the German island Borkum. 19 of the containers and their contents – including organic peroxides, children's toys, shoes, bags, cushions, chairs, televisions, and plastic packaging – washed ashore on the Dutch islands of Vlieland, Terschelling, Ameland and Schiermonnikoog and German island Borkum in the Wadden Sea, a protected UNESCO biosphere reserve. In 2020, the Dutch Safety Board, German BSU and Panama Maritime Authority published a joint report on their investigation of the incident. It notes that the loss of containers occurred over several hours, due to strong rolling and the associated accelerations caused by the prevalent sea conditions at the time. Although it finds that the loading and securing of the cargo was in accordance with current regulations, it recommends to revise the regulations with special consideration of very large container ships.

Sisterships
MSC Oscar
MSC Oliver
MSC Maya
MSC Sveva

See also
 List of largest container ships
 Largest container shipping companies

References

2015 ships
Container ships
Ships built by Daewoo Shipbuilding & Marine Engineering
Maritime incidents in 2019